Licania is a genus of over 200 species of trees and shrubs in the family Chrysobalanaceae. Species are found naturally occurring in Neotropical forests from southern Mexico to Brazil and the Lesser Antilles. Due to increased deforestation and loss of habitat, several species have declined, some markedly so, and L. caldasiana from Colombia appears to have gone extinct in recent years. Many species are either rare or restricted in distribution and therefore potentially threatened with future extinction.

Several species are used as ornamental plants. Licania fruit are important food for many animals and can also be eaten by humans. Caterpillars of a possible new taxon of the Astraptes fulgerator cryptic species complex were found on  L. arborea but do not seem to eat them regularly. Like other members of its family, the genus is known for producing a diverse array of flavonoid compounds.

Selected species

Species include:

 Licania arborea
 Licania caldasiana
 Licania chiriquiensis
 Licania conferruminata
 Licania fasciculata
 Licania grandibracteata
 Licania hedbergii
 Licania humilis
 Licania kunthiana
 Licania longicuspidata
 Licania longipetala
 Licania megalophylla
 Licania michauxii – Gopher apple, ground oak
 Licania morii
 Licania platypus – Sansapote
 Licania pyrifolia – Merecure
 Licania rigida – oiticica (Brazil)
 Licania salicifolia
 Licania splendens
 Licania tomentosa – oitizeiro (Brazil)
 Licania vasquezii
 Licania velutina

References

External links

 
Chrysobalanaceae genera
Taxonomy articles created by Polbot